This is a list of aircraft carried undersea and used from submarines (see Submarine aircraft carriers).

These were primarily used during the Second World War, also included for comparison are earlier developments of submarine carried aircraft from the First World War and the period between the World Wars.

|-
| Aichi M6A1 Seiran || Japan || Propeller || portable strike monoplane torpedo-bomber ||  ||  ||  || 
|-
| Arado Ar 231 || Germany || Propeller || portable reconnaissance floatplane ||  ||  ||  || 
|-
| Bristol-Burney X.1,2,3 || UK ||  || flying hydrofoil ||  ||  ||  || 
|-
| Caspar-Heinkel U-1 || USA / Germany || Propeller || dismantlable reconnaissance biplane ||  ||  ||  || 
|-
| Chyetverikov SPL || USSR || Propeller ||  ||  ||  ||  || 
|-
| Cox-Klemin XS-1 || USA || Propeller || portable reconnaissance biplane || 1920s ||  ||  || 
|-
| Cox-Klemin XS-2 || USA || Propeller || experimental scout biplane || 1920s ||  ||  || 
|-
| Focke-Achgelis Fa 330 "Bachstelze" || Germany || Rotorcraft || observation ||  ||  ||  || Rotor kite
|-
| Fieseler Fi 103 "V-1" || Germany || Jet || flying-bomb launched from submarine development ||  ||  ||  || 
|-
| Flettner Fl 282A-2 "Kolibri" || Germany || Rotorcraft || dismantlable reconnaissance  ||  || Project || 0 || Helicopter
|-
| Friedrichshafen FF.29 || Germany || Propeller || dismantlable reconnaissance biplane ||  ||  ||  || 
|-
| Hansa Brandenburg W.20 || Germany || Propeller || portable reconnaissance flying boat ||  ||  ||  || 
|-
| Loening XSL-1 || USA|| Propeller || flying boat ||  ||  ||  || 
|-
| Luftfahrzeug Gesellschaft L.F.G Stralsund V.19 || Germany || Propeller || reconnaissance monoplane ||  ||  ||  || 
|-
| Macchi M.53 || Italy || Propeller || reconnaissance ||  ||  ||  || 
|-
| Martin MS-1 || USA || Propeller || dismantlable reconnaissance biplane || 1920s ||  ||  || 
|-
| Parnall-Peto || UK || Propeller || dismantlable reconnaissance biplane ||  ||  ||  || 
|-
| Piaggio P.8 || Italy || Propeller || reconnaissance ||  ||  ||  || 
|-
| "Loon" flying guided bomb || USA || Jet || submarine missile launcher development ||  ||  ||  || 
|-
| Sopwith Schneider seaplane || UK || Propeller || experimental reconnaissance trial ||  || Prototype ||  || Modified example.
|-
| Watanabe E9W1 "Slim" || Japan|| Propeller || portable reconnaissance biplane ||  ||  ||  || 
|-
| Yokosuka E14Y1 "Glen" || Japan || Propeller || reconnaissance monoplane ||  ||  ||  || 
|-
| Yokosuka E6Y1-N || Japan || Propeller || reconnaissance biplane ||  ||  ||  || 
|-
| Mureaux Besson MB-411 || France || Propeller || portable reconnaissance monoplane ||  ||  ||  || 
|}

References

Lists of aircraft by role
Lists of military aircraft
Submarine aircraft carriers